Radekan (also Romanized as Rādekān and Rādkān; also known as Rakan) is a village in Ramand-e Shomali Rural District, Khorramdasht District, Takestan County, Qazvin Province, Iran. At the 2006 census, its population was 2,092, in 530 families.

References 

Populated places in Takestan County